The Tears of Dragons may refer to:

 Tears of the Dragon, a single by Bruce Dickinson
 Dragon Tears, a novel by Dean Koontz
 Tears of Dragon (용의 눈물) a South-Korean film.